Jana Novotná was the defending champion, but did not compete this year.

Serena Williams won the title by defeating Denisa Chládková 6–1, 6–1 in the final.

Seeds
The top four seeds received a bye to the second round.

Draw

Finals

Top half

Bottom half

External links
 Official results archive (ITF)
 Official results archive (WTA)

Faber Grand Prix
2000 WTA Tour